Pavlovich  may refer to:

 Pavlovich (patronymic), a patronymic
 Pavlovich (surname), a surname
Pavlovich v. Superior Court, a California Supreme Court case dealing with personal jurisdiction based on online activities